The Roman Catholic Diocese of Djibouti is the Latin sole diocese in the country of Djibouti in the Horn of Africa.

It is exempt, i.e. directly subject to the Holy See and its missionary Roman Congregation for the Evangelization of Peoples.

It has its Cathedral episcopal see, the Our Lady of the Good Shepherd Cathedral, Djibouti (French Marian Cathédrale de Notre-Dame du Bon-Pasteur; dedicated to Our Lady of the Good Shepherd), in the national capital Djibouti City.

Statistics 
As per 2014, it pastorally served 5,000 Catholics (0.6% of 850,000 total) on 23,200 km² in 5 parishes and a mission with 4 diocesan priests and 29 lay religious (1 brother, 28 sisters).

History 

 Established on April 28, 1914, as Apostolic Prefecture of Djibouti, on the colonial territory of French Somaliland, canonically split off from the vast Apostolic Vicariate of Galla (based in Ethiopia, from which also sprang the Apostolic Prefecture of Benadir, for British Somaliland and Italian Somaliland, which became the Roman Catholic Diocese of Mogadiscio covering all modern Somalia)
 Promoted on September 14, 1955, as Diocese of Djibouti.

Ordinaries 
(all Roman rite and so far members of missionary Latin congregations)

 Apostolic Prefects of Djibouti 
 Friar Pasquale da Luchon, Capuchin Friars Minor (O.F.M. Cap.) (1914 – death 1923)
 Fr. Marcelliano da La Guerche, O.F.M. Cap. (1937.10.22 – death 1945)
 Fr. Henri-Bernardin Hoffmann, O.F.M. Cap. (1945.09.28 – 1955.09.14 see below)

Exempt Bishops of Djibouti 
 Henri-Bernardin Hoffmann, O.F.M. Cap. (see above 1955.09.14 – death 1979.03.21)
 Michel-Joseph-Gérard Gagnon, White Fathers (M. Afr.) (1980.03.28 – retired 1987.07.03); later Bishop of Laghouat (Algeria, another former French colony) (1991.02.04 – death 2004.06.01)
 Georges Perron, O.F.M. Cap. (1992.11.21 – retired 2001.03.13), previously Apostolic Administrator of the Apostolic Vicariate of Harar (Ethiopia) (1982 – resigned 1992.11.21)
 Giorgio Bertin, Friars Minor (O.F.M.) (2001.03.13 – ), also Apostolic Administrator of Roman Catholic Diocese of Mogadiscio (Somalia) (1990– ...)

See also 
 Roman Catholicism in Djibouti

Sources and external links 
 GCatholic.org, with Google satellite photo
 Catholic Hierarchy

Roman Catholic dioceses in Djibouti
Christian organizations established in 1914
Roman Catholic dioceses and prelatures established in the 20th century